Dom-e Asman (also Romanized as Dom-e Āsmān, Dam Asman, and Dom Āsmān; also known as Dum Āsmān) is a village in Jolgeh Rural District, in the Central District of Golpayegan County, Isfahan Province, Iran. At the 2006 census, its population was 348, in 112 families.

References 

Populated places in Golpayegan County